Brockton is an unincorporated community in Jackson County, in the U.S. state of Georgia.

History
The community was named after Charles O. Brock, a local, family doctor.

References

Unincorporated communities in Jackson County, Georgia